The ASEAN Common Time (ACT) is a proposal to adopt a standard time for all Association of Southeast Asian Nations member states. It was proposed in 1995 by Singapore, and in 2004 and 2015 by Malaysia to make business across countries easier. The proposal failed because of opposition in Thailand and Cambodia: Thais and Cambodians argued that UTC+08:00 was not really better than UTC+07:00, which is their current time zone.

Currently, there are four different time zones used by ASEAN countries. UTC+06:30 (Myanmar); UTC+07:00 (Cambodia, Laos, Thailand, Vietnam, and western Indonesia); UTC+08:00 (Brunei, central Indonesia, Malaysia, Philippines, and Singapore); and UTC+09:00 (eastern Indonesia).

The proposal would institute UTC+08:00 as the ASEAN Central Time, putting Myanmar at UTC+07:00, and leaving the less populous eastern Indonesia at UTC+09:00. This would result in the vast majority of the region's people and territory lining up at UTC+08:00—in sync with China, Hong Kong, Macau, Taiwan, and Western Australia, while eastern islands of Indonesia would remain at UTC+09:00—in sync with Japan, South Korea, North Korea, East Timor and Palau.

Some regional businesses have already begun adopting the phrase "ASEAN Common Time", also using the abbreviation ACT, in their press releases, communications, and legal documents. The idea has since been under discussion by ASEAN, with Singapore supporting it strongly.

List

External links

See also
 Time in Southeast Asia
Myanmar Standard Time
Philippine Standard Time
Singapore Standard Time
Time in Brunei
Time in Cambodia
Time in Indonesia
Time in Laos
Time in Malaysia
Time in Thailand
Time in Vietnam

Notes

References

Time zones
ASEAN laws
Time in Southeast Asia